Murang'a is a town in Murang'a County of Kenya. Before the independence of Kenya in 1963, this town used to be called Fort Hall. It is the administrative centre of Murang'a County and is mainly inhabited by the Kikuyu community. 
According to the 2019 census, the town has a population of about 110,000.

Overview  
Murang'a is located between Nyeri and Thika. The town of Maragua is located 10 kilometres south of Murang'a while Sagana town is 15 kilometres northeast.
It lies on a latitude of -0.7167 (0° 43’ South) and longitude of 37.1500 (37° 8’ East)

The town is low, a bit hilly, small but picturesque with an altitude of 4120 ft (1255 metres) above sea level. As a result of the varying altitudes, Murang'a can get quite cold from May to mid-August, and can experience hail. To the west of the town can be seen the rolling Kikuyu farmlands that extend as far as the eyes can see.

Murang'a is a fast-growing town that attracts traders and farmers from the neighbouring districts. It has banks, petrol stations, a post office, lodges, nightclubs playing the latest local and Western music, restaurants serving local and exotic dishes, supermarkets, dry cleaners, and lively marketplaces. It has also a relatively busy bus and matatu transportation terminal. A district general hospital is located in the northern corner of the town.  The town is accessible from Nairobi by Thika-Murang'a road and from Nyeri.

Murang'a county got its first governor in the year 2013 when H.E Mwangi Iria was elected by TNA ticket to be the first constitutional governor.

Climate 
Muranga has a tropical savannah climate (Aw) and is warmer than the adjacent highlands bordering it some few kilometres east. High temperatures can surpass 35 °C in the months of October to March. Those are the hottest months in the area. As mentioned, days can get really chilly from May to mid-August.

Average temperatures

High temperatures
January – 34.5
February – 33.8
March – 31.1
April –  28.2
May – 26.6
June – 25.1
July – 24.3
August – 22.8
September – 24.0
October – 26.2
November – 29.0
December – 33.3

See also 

 Railway stations in Kenya
Murang'a High School

References 

 
Murang'a County
Populated places in Central Province (Kenya)
County capitals in Kenya